Kirsten McLeod (born 30 May 1994) is an Australian rules footballer playing for the Western Bulldogs in the AFL Women's competition. McLeod was drafted by the Western Bulldogs with their fourth selection and twenty-eighth overall in the 2016 AFL Women's draft. She made her debut in the thirty-two point win against  at VU Whitten Oval in the opening round of the 2017 season. She played six matches in her debut season and kicked four goals. It was revealed that McLeod had signed a contract extension with the club on 16 June 2021, after playing 8 out 9 possible games for the club that season.

Statistics
Statistics are correct to the end of the 2021 season.

|- style=background:#EAEAEA
| scope=row | 2017 ||  || 6
| 6 || 4 || 8 || 26 || 16 || 42 || 3 || 14 || 0.6 || 1.3 || 4.3 || 2.7 || 7.0 || 0.5 || 2.3 || 0
|-
| scope=row bgcolor=F0E68C | 2018# ||  || 6
| 4 || 3 || 1 || 14 || 3 || 17 || 5 || 10 || 0.8 || 0.3 || 3.5 || 0.8 || 4.3 || 1.3 || 2.5 || 0
|- style=background:#EAEAEA
| scope=row | 2019 ||  || 6
| 6 || 2 || 5 || 24 || 4 || 28 || 7 || 11 || 0.3 || 0.8 || 4.0 || 0.6 || 4.6 || 1.7 || 1.8 || 0
|-
| scope=row | 2020 ||  || 6
| 6 || 5 || 5 || 38 || 5 || 43 || 13 || 11 || 0.8 || 0.8 || 6.3 || 0.8 || 7.1 || 2.2 || 1.8 || 0
|- style=background:#EAEAEA
| scope=row | 2021 ||  || 6
| 2 || 7 || 2 || 43 || 6 || 49 || 12 || 17 || 0.9 || 0.3 || 5.4 || 0.8 || 6.1 || 1.5 || 2.1 || 0
|- class=sortbottom
! colspan=3 | Career
! 30 !! 21 !! 21 !! 145 !! 34 !! 179 !! 40 !! 63 !! 0.7 !! 0.7 !! 4.8 !! 1.1 !! 6.0 !! 1.3 !! 2.1 !! 0
|}

References

External links 

1994 births
Living people
Western Bulldogs (AFLW) players
Australian rules footballers from Victoria (Australia)
Victorian Women's Football League players